Bangweulu may refer to
Bangweulu Block, part of the Congo craton of central Africa
Bangweulu tsessebe, an antelope found in Zambia
Bangweulu Wetlands in Zambia
Lake Bangweulu in Zambia